Borghild Niskin (19 February 1924 – 18 January 2013) was a Norwegian alpine skier who finished 7th in the women's giant slalom at the 1956 Winter Olympics at Cortina d'Ampezzo. She became the first woman awarded  the Holmenkollen medal that same year. (Shared with fellow Norwegians Arnfinn Bergmann and Arne Hoel.)

She is one of only eleven non-Nordic skiers to win the Holmenkollen medal (Stein Eriksen, King Haakon VII, Inger Bjørnbakken, Astrid Sandvik, King Olav V, Erik Håker, Jacob Vaage, King Harald V, and Queen Sonja. (all from Norway), and Ingemar Stenmark (Sweden) are the others.) She also finished fifth in the  alpine combined event at the Alpine World Skiing Championships in 1956.

References

External links

 - click Holmenkollmedaljen for downloadable pdf file 

1924 births
2013 deaths
Norwegian resistance members
Female resistance members of World War II
Norwegian women in World War II
Norwegian female alpine skiers
Olympic alpine skiers of Norway
Alpine skiers at the 1948 Winter Olympics
Alpine skiers at the 1952 Winter Olympics
Alpine skiers at the 1956 Winter Olympics
Holmenkollen medalists
Place of birth missing
Place of death missing
20th-century Norwegian women